Vans Valley may refer to:

Vans Valley, Georgia, an unincorporated community in Floyd County
Vans Valley, Ohio, an unincorporated community in Delaware County